The Armoured Vault is a 1926 German silent thriller film directed by Lupu Pick and starring Ernst Reicher, Johannes Riemann, and Mary Nolan. It was part of a popular series featuring the detective character Stuart Webbs, and a remake of an earlier film The Armoured Vault directed by Joe May in 1914.

The film's sets were designed by Rudi Feld. It was shot at the Staaken Studios in Berlin.

Cast

References

Bibliography

External links

1926 films
Films of the Weimar Republic
Films directed by Lupu Pick
German silent feature films
UFA GmbH films
German thriller films
German black-and-white films
1920s thriller films
Films shot at Staaken Studios
Remakes of German films
Silent thriller films
1920s German films